Pavel Vladimirovich Smurov (born 21 July 1979) is a former Russian professional footballer.

Club career
He made his professional debut in the Russian First Division in 1997 for FC Energiya Kamyshin.

Honours
 Russian Cup finalist: 2005.

References

Russian footballers
FC Tekstilshchik Kamyshin players
FC Olimpia Volgograd players
FC Khimki players
FC Luch Vladivostok players
1979 births
People from Kamyshin
Living people
Association football midfielders
Association football defenders
FC Spartak Kostroma players
FC Spartak Nizhny Novgorod players
Sportspeople from Volgograd Oblast